Goebbels: A Biography is a 2015 book by Peter Longerich. The book presents an account and analysis of the life of Nazi propaganda minister Joseph Goebbels, with extensive material from his diary which he kept from 1923 to 1945. It is an English translation of the 2010 German book  Goebbels: Biographie by Longerich.

Following its publication, Goebbels' estate sued publisher Random House, because the book quotes excerpts from his diaries without paying royalties to his estate.

References 

Joseph Goebbels
2010 non-fiction books